Kethu Viswanatha Reddy, also known as Ketu Visvanathareddi,  is a short story writer, novelist and essayist who won 
Sahitya Akademi Award in Telugu, 1996 for his short story Kethu Viswanatha Reddy Kathalu.

Career

Kethu Viswanatha Reddy (born July 10, 1939) is a short story writer, novelist and essayist whose writings have been translated into modern Indian languages such as Hindi, Bengali, Kannada, Malayalam and English and Russian. 

He has worked many variations on the theme of rural transformation in southern Andhra Pradesh - Rayalaseema - the Semi-Arid zone, its famines, factions and industrialization.His first short story ‘Anaadivaallu’ was published in ‘Savyasaachi’ journal. He has worked many variations on the theme of rural transformation in southern Andhra Pradesh - Rayalaseema - the Semi-Arid zone, its famines, factions and industrialisation.

'Kethu Viswanatha Reddy Kathalu' (1998 – 2003) ‘Japthu’ ‘Ichhagni’ are his great and reputed collections of short stories. Verlu, Bodhi, are his praiseworthy novels. Dristi, Deepadaarulu are Dr. Viswanatha Reddy's collections of essays .Dr.Kethu Viswanatha Reddy's six books.." Kethu Viswanatha Reddy kathalu,Kethu Viswanatha Reddy kathalu 2, Parichayam, Patrikeyam, Sangamam, Mana Kodavatiganti " were released at a time on the occasion of AVKF lifetime award presentation to Dr. Viswanatha Reddy in KADAPA IN January 2009.He edited the collections of Kodavatiganti Kutumba Rao's writings. He got doctorate degree( Ph.D) for his great research work ‘Kadapa jilla graama namaala charitra’ . (The history of village names of Kadapa district). A good book by name ‘voollu, pearlu’ was published on this work.

He has received awards from various organisations including Central Sahitya Academy (New Delhi), Bhartiya Bhasa Parishad (Calcutta), Telugu University (Hyderabad) and several others including Raavi Shastry Award for literature. For Academic excellence, Best Teacher Award for University teachers from Government of Andhra Pradesh.

Dr. Viswanatha Reddy retired as Director of Dr. B.R.Ambedkar Open University. At present Dr.Reddy is holding responsibilities as the Chief Editor of ‘Eebhoomi’, the esteemed Telugu socio-political weekly which is being managed by VISU consultant's supremo and noted film producer sri CC Reddy.

Literary Works 
 Anaadivaallu
 Kethu Viswanatha Reddy Kathalu (1998 - 2003)
 Verlu - Bodhi (1994)
 Icchagni (1996)
 Japtu (1974)
 Drishti
 Deepadaarulu 
 Parichayam
 Patrikeyam
 Sangamam
 Mana Kodavatiganti

Awards and honours

For Literature 
 Sahitya Akademi Award in Telugu, 1996
 Bhartiya Bhasa Parishad 1996(Calcutta) Award
 Raavi Shastry Award
 1992 Tummala Venkata Ramaiah gold Medal for literature.
 1994 Telugu University Award 
 1995 Pulupula Venkata Sivaiah Award for literature.
 1996 Humanscape's short story Award
 1999 Visala Sahiti Award
 2001 Raavi Shastry Award
 1974 Prize for the Textbooks for adults
 1982 Sri Venkateswara University Endowment Prize

As Teacher
 Best Teacher Award for University teachers from Government of Andhra Pradesh.
 1992 - 1993 Recipient of Best Teacher Award for University Teachers
 1993 Visiting Fellow, Sri Padmavathi Mahila University, Tirupati, A. P.
 1998 Visiting Fellow, Sri Venkateswara University, Tirupati (A.P.)
 2000 - 2001 Visiting Fellow, Sri Venkateswara University, Tirupati, (A.P.)

References

External links
 Kethu Viswanatha Reddy home page
 kethuviswanathareddy.blogspot.com

Writers from Andhra Pradesh
1939 births
Living people
Telugu writers
Recipients of the Sahitya Akademi Award in Telugu